Throttle Junkies is the first studio album by American rock band SOiL. It was released on May 18, 1999 via MIA Records. It included tracks previously released on the band's EPs Soil and El Chupacabra. While it did not chart in the US, it reached #16 on the CMJ New Music Report.

Not long after the album's release, MIA folded. This led to Soil developing demos that eventually gained them a major label deal with J Records.

The album was re-released with bonus tracks on August 14, 2007.

Track listing

Personnel
 Ryan McCombs – lead vocals
 Adam Zadel – lead guitar, backing vocals
 Shaun Glass – rhythm guitar
 Tim King – bass guitar
 Tom Schofield – drums

References

1999 debut albums
Soil (American band) albums